Pierre Courteys (d. 1602? ) was a French enamel painter, working in Limoges.

Life
Courteys, one of the best enamel painters of Limoges, and an excellent designer and colourist, was probably a disciple of Pierre Reymond. The dates affixed to his works range from 1550 to 1568. In 1559 he executed twelve oval medallions with life-sized figures of the Virtues and the gods of Olympus,  for the façade of the château of Madrid, built by Francis I and Henry II in the Bois de Boulogne in Paris.  Nine of these are now in the Hôtel de Cluny, and three are in England. They are the largest enamels which have ever been made at Limoges. Courteys is thought to have died in 1602. Many of his works are in the Louvre.

References

Sources

 

Year of birth unknown
1602 deaths
16th-century French painters
French male painters
French enamellers
16th-century enamellers
People from Limoges
Limoges enamel